County Road 5098 is an  county road in Ullensvang Municipality in  Vestland county, Norway. The road runs from the village of Jondal to the municipal subdivision of Krossdalen.

The route branches off from Norwegian County Road 550 and follows the Jondal River (Jondalselvi) east to Lake Byrkjeland (Byrkjelandsvatnet) and Lake Espeland (Espelandsvatnet) and then continues further east along the Krossdal River (Krossdalselvi) to its beginning at the confluence of the Brattabø River (Brattabøelvi) and Flatabø River (Flatabøelvi), where it terminates at the Brattabø farm.

The road was re-numbered in 2019 because Hordaland and Sogn og Fjordane counties were scheduled to merge and there were county roads in both counties with the same number. This road previously was County Road 105.

References

External links
Statens vegvesen – trafikkmeldinger Fv105 (Traffic Information: County Road 105)

5098
Ullensvang